This uniform polyhedron compound is a symmetric arrangement of 12 pentagonal prisms, aligned in pairs with the axes of fivefold rotational symmetry of a dodecahedron.

It results from composing the two enantiomorphs of the compound of six pentagonal prisms. In doing so, the vertices of the two enantiomorphs coincide, with the result that the full compound has two pentagonal prisms incident on each of its vertices.

Related polyhedra 

This compound shares its vertex arrangement with four uniform polyhedra as follows:

References 
.

Polyhedral compounds